Coenonympha amaryllis is a small butterfly found in the East Palearctic that belongs to the browns family.

Description from Seitz

C. amaryllis. Upperside uniformly sandy yellow as in pamphilus, sometimes, especially in the female, slightly shaded at the distal margin. Underside pale honey-yellow, hindwing washed with greyish green ; a faint line runs through the disc of the forewing. Rows of ocelli of very diverse development are situated before the distal margin. These are most distinct in the form accrescens Stgr. from North China and Corea. This form , which is especially common around Pekin (where specimens are found flying about in gardens, yards, and even in the streets), bears on the underside of the forewing 3 or 4 and on the hindwings 6 almost similar large ocelli with a metallic centre, which appear above as heavy black spots or small rings. — The first-described form, amaryllis Cr. (= amarillis Hbst.) (48 g), which occurs throughout Siberia and Mongolia, from the Ural to the Amur, has still the complete number of ocelli, but they are rather smaller, and only a few of them shine through above as minute black dots. — In rinda Men. (48 g), from Central and Eastern Siberia, the black ground of the ocelli has almost disappeared, so that the latter are very light, and the whole underside of all the wings is strongly dulled with grey. — In evanescens Alph., finality, the ocelli on the underside are obsolete except for a few traces, and on the upperside no pupils can be seen shining through. The metallic line on the underside is also absent. Amdo. — Small specimens from Ordos with especially washed-out markings on the underside have been designated ordossi by Alpheraky. — The butterflies are on the wing in June and July, are common and fond of settling on  sandy places and stony mountain-roads or field-paths.

Biology
The larva feeds on Poa.

See also
List of butterflies of Europe

References

Satyrinae
Butterflies described in 1782